Horus (fl. 4th century) was a Cynic philosopher and Olympic boxer, who was victorious at the Olympic games in Antioch in 364 AD.

He was born in Egypt, son of one Valens; Horus was originally a student of rhetoric and an athlete and was a victor at the Ancient Olympic Games in Antioch in 364, probably as a boxer. Horus was also commended in that year, alongside his brother Phanes, to Maximus praefectus Aegypti, and Eutocius. He later turned to Cynic philosophy.

Horus appears as an interlocutor in Macrobius's Saturnalia, (dramatic date 384) and as a friend of Symmachus, who commended him to Nicomachus Flavianus.

Notes

References
Arnold Hugh Martin Jones, John Robert Martindale, J. Morris, (1971), The Prosopography of the Later Roman Empire, page 445. Cambridge University Press
R. Bracht Branham, Marie-Odile Goulet-Cazé, (2000), The Cynics: The Cynic Movement in Antiquity and its Legacy, page 396. University of California Press

Roman-era Cynic philosophers
Ancient Egyptian boxers
4th-century Egyptian people
Egyptian male boxers